Anodontoides is a genus of freshwater mussels, an aquatic bivalve mollusk in the family Unionidae, the river mussels.

Species
Species within the genus Anodontoides:
 Anodontoides ferussacianus (I. Lea, 1834)- Found in creeks and small rivers usually with high concentrations of mud and sand. 
 Anodontoides radiatus- Has been considered for being put on the endangered species list.

Geographical Range 
Andontoides a cylindrical papershell mussel can be found in the Mississippi River, St. Lawrence River and Great Lakes in shallow freshwater. They can be found as far south as Tennessee and Arkansas, west as Colorado, and North as Manitoba. Specifically, Andontoides ferussacianus can be found all over the world. Looking specifically at Anodontides radiatus has been found in the Gulf of Mexico drainages and parts of western Florida and southern Louisiana.

Reproduction 
Glochidia from Anodontoides common hosts have been identified as mottled sculpins, sea lampreys, brook sticklebacks, white suckers, Iowa darters, common shiners, blacknose shiners, bluntnose minnows, fathead minnow, black crappie, bluegill and Largemouth bass.

Longevity 
Anodontoides ferussacianus- Life expectancy varies from 3 to 16 years with an average of 9 years.

References

Unionidae
Taxonomy articles created by Polbot
Bivalve genera